Lisa Wolf is a North Dakota Democratic-NPL Party member of the North Dakota House of Representatives, representing the 3rd district since 2007.

External links
North Dakota Legislative Assembly - Representative Lisa Wolf official ND Senate website
Project Vote Smart - Representative Lisa Wolf (ND) profile
Follow the Money - Lisa Wolf
2006 campaign contributions
North Dakota Democratic-NPL Party - Representative Lisa Wolf profile

Minot State University alumni
Members of the North Dakota House of Representatives
Living people
Women state legislators in North Dakota
21st-century American politicians
21st-century American women politicians
Year of birth missing (living people)